Peppino Mazzotta (born 20 May 1971) is an Italian actor, known for playing police officer Giuseppe Fazio in Il commissario Montalbano mystery series based on the character and novels created by Andrea Camilleri. Mazzotta is a native of Domanico (Province of Cosenza).

Career
Born in the Calabrian town of Domanico in 1971, Mazzotta attended the Faculty of Architecture at the university of Reggio Calabria, then joined a Drama School at Palmi, and discovered his great acting passion. He later founded in Naples the theatre company Rosso Tiziano (Titian Red) together with five colleagues of the Palmi Academy, with whom he continues to collaborate. 
In 2003 he created a new theatre company, named Teatri del Sud (Southern Theatres), together with playwright and script-writer Francesco Suriano, who produced plays in the Calabrian dialect. The company closed after three years of activity, due to lack of financial support from the Arts, but Mazzotta is still very active in the regional theatre, especially in the production of Greek plays.

Peppino Mazzotta is best known for portraying police detective Giuseppe Fazio, in the renowned Italian television series Inspector Montalbano, produced and broadcast by RAI since 1999, and based on the detective novels of Andrea Camilleri. The protagonist is Commissario Salvo Montalbano, and Mazzotta plays his loyal, hyper-efficient right-hand man in the fictional town of Vigata, Sicily.

In the summer of 2012, during the Positano Theatre Festival, Mazzotta was awarded the Annibale Ruccello Prize for his theatrical production Radio Argo.

Mazzotta's career is currently divided between theatre, cinema and television, in a busy schedule of engagements and guest appearances. He continues to play Inspector Montalbano's assistant in the new episodes of the Italian TV series.

In autumn 2016 Mazzotta played Bruno Corona, a fictional 'Ndrangheta boss in "Solo" a dramatic television series broadcast by  Canale 5 and set in  Gioia Tauro,  Calabria.

Credits

Theatre
La Torre D'Avorio  
Radio Argo, awarded the Premio della Critica, Florence 2011
Requiescat 
L'arrobbafumu
Alè Alè Cita
A cascia 'nfernali
Tomba di cani
Illuminato a morte
Tartuffe
Il decimo anno
La bisbetica domata
La Celestina
L' agnello del povero
Molto rumore per nulla
Giulio Cesare

Cinema
A Classic Horror Story (2021)
Anime nere (2014)
Piacere... Io sono Piero!, (2012)
La misura del confine, (2011)
Noi credevamo (2010)
Cado dalle nubi, (2009)
La velocità della luce, (2008)
Il pugile e la ballerina, (2006)
A Children's Story, (2004)
Prima del tramonto, (2004) 
Domenica, (2001)

Television
Inspector Montalbano, (whole series since 1999)
Anthony of Padua, (2002)
Paolo Borsellino (television series), (2004)
Distretto di Polizia (Police Precinct), 5th season (a character in 2005) 
R.I.S. - Delitti imperfetti, 3rd season (2007)
Il Capitano, 2nd season (2007)
Per una notte d'amore (2008)
Crimini 2 - "Niente di personale (Nothing personal)" - Rai 2 2010
Squadra antimafia (2010)
Un Mondo Nuovo (TV film) (2015)
"Solo" (television series) (2016)

Notes

External links 

From "Le Interviste di Teatro.Org": Il talento vulcanico di Peppino Mazzotta, interprete di “Nzularchia” (Peppino Mazzotta volcanic talent) 
Interview with Mazzotta, on Linking Calabria of June 9, 2011. 
Radio Argo, article on Arteven  Accessed November 28, 2012

Living people
Italian male stage actors
1971 births
People from the Province of Cosenza
Italian male television actors
Italian male film actors
21st-century Italian male actors